Farjad Darvishi, a 23-year old Iranian man, was killed on 19 September 2022 by police in the Waliasr town of Urmia, Iran.

Biography 
Darvishi was from the Balo village in Urmia.

Death 

Darvishi was protesting alongside other Urmian citizens against Iranian leadership in the wake of the death of Mahsa Amini. He was shot by police security agents during the demonstration and died on his way to the hospital from the injuries sustained from the gun shots. As of 21 September 2022, The Kurdistan Human Rights Organization confirmed his killing as one out of six other protestors' deaths including Mohsen Mohammadi, Fereydoun Mahmoudi, Reza Lotfi, Zakariya Khiyal, Foad Ghadimi, and Minou Majidi to have died during the September 2022 Iranian protests.

See also 

 Killing of Hadis Najafi

References  

September 2022 events in Iran
2022 deaths
Women's rights in Iran
Deaths by person in Iran
Protest-related deaths
Deaths by firearm in Iran
People shot dead by law enforcement officers